The Charleston Battery are an American professional soccer club based in Charleston, South Carolina, and member of the USL Championship. Founded in 1993, the Battery are one of the oldest continuously operating professional soccer clubs in the United States, tied with the Richmond Kickers.

Charleston are one of the more successful lower division soccer clubs in the United States, having won the USISL Pro League in 1996, the USL A-League in 2003, and the final season of the USL Second Division in 2010. In 2012, the team won the USL Pro Championship, winning its fourth league title in club history. Charleston are also the most successful club in the history of the unofficial Southern Derby competition with nine first-place finishes.

The Battery currently play at Patriots Point Soccer Complex in Mount Pleasant, South Carolina. Previously, the club played its home games at the soccer-specific MUSC Health Stadium in the Daniel Island section of Charleston from 1999 to 2019. The team's colors are black and yellow, with a traditional red scheme for away uniforms. From 2004 through the 2021 season, their head coach and general manager was Mike Anhaeuser.

History
The Battery was formed in 1993 by an ownership group of local soccer enthusiasts led by Tony Bakker, a native of London who had relocated his software company Blackbaud to the Charleston area in 1989. The club hired experienced college coach and University of South Carolina graduate Tim Hankinson to develop the team, and the Battery started as a member of the USISL, which eventually evolved and came to be known as the USL in 1995. The Battery won their first league championship in 1996 under Portuguese manager Nuno Piteira, defeating the Charlotte Eagles 3–2 in the final. In 1997 Charleston became one of the original clubs of the newly branded A-League (later the USL First Division).

In 1999 the Battery moved into what is now known as MUSC Health Stadium, becoming the first non-Major League Soccer professional club in the United States to build its own stadium, and forged a reputation as one of the country's most well-established lower division clubs. The Battery hired veteran English coach Alan Dicks and signed many experienced domestic players such as Paul Conway, Dan Calichman and Eric Wynalda while also bringing in notable foreign signings such as Terry Phelan and Raúl Díaz Arce. In 2001 Dicks was replaced by fellow Englishman Chris Ramsey, who led Charleston to the A-League championship in 2003 with a 3–0 victory in the final over Minnesota Thunder in Charleston. Following Ramsey's departure in 2004, the club promoted longtime player and assistant coach Mike Anhaeuser to be the club's new coach.

In 2008 the Battery reached the Lamar Hunt US Open Cup final for the first time, playing against Major League Soccer team D.C. United at RFK Stadium. In the final the Battery conceded an early goal but bounced back with a quick-fire equalizer through an Ian Fuller goal, assisted by Chris Williams. Later in the half Lazo Alavanja hit the post but at half time the scores were tied at 1–1. At the start of the second half Charleston conceded early again, but in the final seconds of extra time Marco Reda put the ball in the back of the net for Charleston, only to have his goal controversially disallowed as offside. D.C. United would go on to win the match 2–1.

In 2010 Charleston was invited by several other USL clubs to join the breakaway league eventually known as the North American Soccer League, but the Battery chose to remain in the USL system and self-relegate to the USL Second Division, which eventually became the chief USL professional division. In their first third division season in 2010, Charleston led the league standings for the entire year and went undefeated at home. Charleston defeated the Richmond Kickers 2–1 in the final to claim the club's third league championship. Lamar Neagle was named the USL-2 league MVP and lead the league in scoring with 13 league goals. Anhaeuser was named the league's coach of the year, his second time receiving the honor. In 2012 the Battery won their fourth league title in club history, defeating local rivals Wilmington Hammerheads 1–0 in the final. Micheal Azira scored a 74th-minute winner after Jose Cuevas slipped a pass to him on the left side of the penalty area.

In recent years the Battery have had loan affiliations with several Major League Soccer clubs, beginning with a one-year deal to become the USL Pro affiliate of Vancouver Whitecaps FC in 2014.  For the 2015 season, the Battery signed a one-year deal to affiliate with the Houston Dynamo. On January 15, 2016, it was announced that the club would be partnering with the Atlanta United FC for the 2016 MLS season prior to Atlanta's entry to MLS in 2017.

In February 2016, it was announced that longtime majority owner Tony Bakker had sold the club to B Sports Entertainment, an investment group led by local tech executives. Club president Andrew Bell and coach Mike Anhaeuser remained in charge of team operations after the ownership transition. In early 2018 it was announced that Bell would be leaving the club to take over operations of an announced USL expansion club in Memphis, Tennessee, ending a two-decade career in the Charleston front office. Bell was replaced by club operations officer Mike Kelleher.

In October 2019, it was announced that B Sports Entertainment had sold the club to Rob Salvatore of HCFC, LLC with a move to Patriots Point Soccer Complex in Mount Pleasant.

At the conclusion of the 2021 season, the Battery announced on November 1, 2021, that the club and Mike Anhaeuser had parted ways.  Anhaeuser joined the Charleston Battery as a player in 1994, and switched into a coaching role in 1999. In 2004, he was named head coach of the club and led the Battery to a U.S. Open Cup Final appearance in 2008 as well as two USL Championships in 2010 and 2012.

On December 20, 2021, the Battery announced that they had hired Conor Casey as head coach.  However, on October 12, 2022, with one match remaining in the season and the Battery near the bottom of the Eastern Conference standings, the club and Casey opted to part ways by mutual agreement. Assistant coach Dennis Sanchez was named interim head coach while a search for a permanent replacement began.

On November 17, 2022, the Battery announced that they had hired Memphis 901 FC head coach Ben Pirmann for the same position in Charleston. Pirmann was named the 2022 USL Championship Coach of the Year after leading Memphis to a 2nd-place finish in the Eastern Conference and a spot in the conference semifinals.

Colors and badge

Charleston's traditional colors are yellow, black and red. In the Battery's first few seasons, the home kit was typically black and white with a red accent. Beginning in 1997 the club began using black with yellow stripes, which has remained in use as the home jersey ever since. The Charleston away kit has typically been a combination of red, white and black, though for the 2017 season the away kit is either the 25 Anniversary black and silver combination, or white and black.

The club badge remained the same iconic logo from 1993 through the 2019 season, other than minor adjustments in color, resolution and the addition of four stars representing each of the team's league championships. It is a classic shield in the club's signature yellow and black stripes, featuring a pair of crossed artillery cannons (alluding to the city's naval history and current presence) above a depiction of a football ball.

In December 2019, the club unveiled the new branding for 2020 and moving forward. Matthew Wolff, who has designed a number of logos for soccer clubs around the world, was instrumental in working with Battery ownership to create a modern representation of Charleston's crest.  The new logo featured crossed cannons on a black circle, with the iconic crescent shape, with Charleston emblazoned across the top and 1993, the year the club was established at the bottom.

Stadiums
Stoney Field; Charleston, South Carolina (1993–1998)
MUSC Health Stadium (formerly Blackbaud Stadium); Daniel Island, Charleston, South Carolina (1999–2019)
Patriots Point Soccer Complex; Mount Pleasant, South Carolina (from 2020)

The Battery played their first six seasons in downtown Charleston at Stoney Field, a facility they shared with various college and high school sports teams.

The club moved to MUSC Health Stadium (previously known as Blackbaud Stadium) in the suburban Daniel Island area in 1999. The first privately funded soccer-specific stadium built in the United States, it seats 5,100 people. MUSC Health Stadium is modeled on lower level English soccer stadiums and features an on-site pub called The Three Lions behind the west stand. The stadium site also features a training field and club offices.

In 2016, the ownership built the second-largest video board in the Southeast. MUSC Health Stadium's jumbotron is 3,000 square feet. When comparing the square footage to stadium seats ratio, the video board is the largest in the world.

Additionally, the complex includes sky boxes, a plaza for corporate entertaining, and state-of-the-art media capabilities, making it one of the premier professional soccer venues in the U.S.

In 2019, under new ownership led by Rob Salvatore, the club announced that the Battery would move off Daniel Island to Patriots Point in Mount Pleasant, South Carolina.  The current stadium complex is home to the College of Charleston football, Baseball and Softball teams.  Situated off the Ravenel Bridge in Mt. Pleasant, the Battery's new stadium is back in the heart of Charleston. Patriots Point sits a short drive from all corners of the Holy City and minutes from the best bars, restaurants and attractions the city has to offer.

After extensive renovations and expansion in early 2020, Patriots Point opened to limited fans during the pandemic-shortened 2020 season. The stadium held its grand opening during the 2021 season as fans 'packed the Point' to cheer on the Black and Yellow. The ownership group has continued to expand developments at Patriots Point, with the introduction of premium seating options via shipping containers transformed into suite-like boxes with multiple levels. The stadium currently holds three "suite boxes" that fans can rent out for matches.

Club culture
The independent supporters' group is The Regiment, who stand in Supporters Section directly behind the north goal of the stadium, along with other supporters' groups including the American Outlaws-affiliated Queen Anne's Revenge and the Spanish-speaking Charleston Barra Brava.

The Battery competes for the Coffee Pot Cup every time it faces their rival team D.C. United of Major League Soccer, a trophy established by the two sides' supporters and currently held by DC. The clubs have regularly faced each other in friendlies and cup competitions, with the 2008 US Open Cup final remaining the highest profile match between the two clubs to date. Charleston are also longtime league rivals of the Richmond Kickers.

The supporters' groups compete with supporters of the Charlotte Independence, Jacks Militia in the Southern Derby Cup, which the Battery had won a record nine times.

The supporters' groups compete with supporters of the Tampa Bay Rowdies, Ralph's Mob and the Skyway Casuals, in the No Quarter Derby.

Halfway through the 2021 season, the club introduced a cannon in the stadium to fire off after each Battery goal and at the start and end of matches.

The team's games are broadcast on ESPN+.

Players and staff

Current roster

Staff
 Lee Cohen – Club President
 Ben Pirmann – Head Coach
 Devin Rensing – Assistant Coach
 Leigh Veidman – Assistant Coach
 Brian Jones – Assistant Coach
 Bobby Weisenberger – Head Athletic Trainer

Notable former players

This list includes those former players who received international caps while playing for the team, made significant contributions to the team in terms of appearances or goals, or who made significant contributions to the sport either before they played for the team, or after they left.

 Nelson Akwari
 Osvaldo Alonso
 Mike Anhaeuser
 Lazo Alavanja
 Stephen Armstrong
 Khalil Azmi
 Dan Calichman
 Ted Chronopoulos
 Paul Conway
 Omar Daley
 Raúl Díaz Arce
 Linval Dixon
 Colin Falvey
 Ben Hollingsworth
 Dusty Hudock
 Lee Hurst
 Gilbert Jean-Baptiste
 Dane Kelly
 Forrest Lasso
 John Limniatis
 Lester More
 Lamar Neagle
 Patrick Olalere
 Bo Oshoniyi
 Nicki Paterson
 Terry Phelan
 Zach Prince
 Robert Rosario
 Brent Sancho
 Dean Sewell
 Nicky Spooner
 Temoc Suarez
 Mark Watson
 John Wilson
 Eric Wynalda
 Velko Yotov
 Paul Young

Head coaches
 Tim Hankinson (1993–1994)
 Nuno Piteira (1995–1999)
 Alan Dicks (1999–2001)
 Chris Ramsey (2001–2004)
 Mike Anhaeuser (2004–2021)
 Conor Casey (2021–2022)
 Ben Pirmann (2022-)

Presidents
 Tony Bakker (1993–1998)
 Nigel Cooper (1999–2008)
 Andrew Bell (2008–2018)
 Mike Kelleher (2018–2019)

Honors
USL A-League
Champions (2): 1996*, 2003
Atlantic Division Champions (2): 1995*, 2000
Southeast Division Champions (2): 2002, 2003
USL Second Division
Champions (1): 2010
Regular Season Champions (1): 2010
USL Championship
Champions (1): 2012
U.S. Open Cup
Runner Up (1): 2008
Semifinals (2): 1999, 2004
Quarterfinals (3): 2007, 2009, 2010
Southern Derby
Winner (9): 2003, 2005^, 2009^, 2010, 2011, 2015, 2016, 2017, 2020
^ as co-champions

 No Quarter Derby
 Winner (2): 2020, 2022

Record

Year-by-year

This is a partial list of the last five seasons completed by the Battery. For the full season-by-season history, see List of Charleston Battery seasons.

1. Avg. attendance include statistics from league matches only.
2. Top goalscorer(s) includes all goals scored in league play, playoffs, U.S. Open Cup, and other competitive matches.

Record vs. International and MLS teams

Lamar Hunt U.S. Open Cup Record: W:8–D:1–L:13 
Carolina Challenge Cup Record: W:5–D:9–L:20 
Exhibition Record: W:5–D:2–L:7

See also
Battery Park
Carolina Challenge Cup
Charleston, SC Latest Sports News: Battery stuffs Sounders Battery stuffs Sounders, Charleston Post and Courier Article

References

External links

 
Soccer clubs in South Carolina
Association football clubs established in 1993
USL Championship teams
USL Second Division teams
USL First Division teams
A-League (1995–2004) teams
1993 establishments in South Carolina